Najibullah is a male Muslim given name, composed of the elements Najib and Allah. It means distinguished (servant) of God. It may refer to:

People
Mohammad Najibullah (1947–1996), President of Afghanistan
Najeebullah Anjum (born 1955), Pakistani film and television actor
Najiballah Zarimi (born 1979), Afghan footballer
Najibullah (militant leader) (born ca. 1979), leader of Taliban splinter group Fidai Mahaz in Afghanistan
Najibullah Zazi (born 1985), Afghan imprisoned in the US for terrorist offenses
Najibullah Lafraie, Foreign Minister of Afghanistan between 1992 and 1996
Najibullah Quraishi, Afghan journalist and film maker
Najibullah Zadran, Afghan international cricketer

Places
Kot Najeebullah, town in Pakistan

Arabic-language surnames
Arabic masculine given names